San Vicente is a town in the Manabí province of Ecuador and the capital of San Vicente Canton.

References

External links
 www.manabi.gov.ec

Populated places in Manabí Province